"Tryin' to Throw Your Arms Around the World" is a song by Irish rock band U2, and the ninth track on their 1991 album, Achtung Baby. It is a tongue-in-cheek song about stumbling home drunk after a night out on the town. It is dedicated to the Flaming Colossus nightclub in Los Angeles. The album version includes keyboard playing by producer Brian Eno.

During live performances on Zoo TV Tour from 1992 to 1993, lead singer Bono would spray a bottle of champagne towards the audience. It was played 136 times on the tour, but has not been performed since then. However, it was snippeted at three concerts during the final leg of the U2 360° Tour in July 2011.

The song was edited out of the live video release Zoo TV: Live from Sydney; it was later revealed that the concert ran long and the song needed to be edited in order to fit the concert into a two-hour timeslot. The line "a woman needs a man like a fish needs a bicycle" is a quotation from Irina Dunn.

Covers
The song was reworked for the 2011 tribute album AHK-toong BAY-bi Covered by The Fray. The Denver quartet had supported U2 on the seventh leg of the 360° Tour, during which The Fray's Isaac Slade celebrated his 30th birthday. "They gave me a ping-pong table," he recalled, "and a ping-pong paddle with sunglasses drawn on it."

Personnel
Bono – lead vocals
The Edge – guitar, keyboards, backing vocals
Adam Clayton – bass guitar
Larry Mullen Jr. – drums, percussion
Brian Eno – additional keyboards
Daniel Lanois – additional guitar

See also 
List of covers of U2 songs - Tryin' to Throw Your Arms Around the World

References

External links
 Lyrics and list of performances at U2.com

1991 songs
U2 songs
Song recordings produced by Brian Eno
Songs written by Bono
Songs written by the Edge
Songs written by Adam Clayton
Songs written by Larry Mullen Jr.
Song recordings produced by Daniel Lanois